Vorga is a rural locality (a selo) in Yershichsky District of Smolensk Oblast, Russia. It lies 28 km south of the railway junction Roslavl. Population: 1,231 (2007 est.); 2,400 (1968). Postal code: 216571. Dialing code: +7 48155.

History
A glassworks was built there in 1855.

References

Rural localities in Smolensk Oblast